The Grabovica Hydro Power Plant is one of Bosnia and Herzegovina's largest hydro power plant having an installed electric capacity of 117 MW. It was commissioned is 1982, and is operated by JP Elektroprivreda BiH.

References

Hydroelectric power stations in Bosnia and Herzegovina